The Angara (Buryat and , Angar,  "Cleft"; , Angará) is a major river in Siberia, which traces a course through Russia's Irkutsk Oblast and Krasnoyarsk Krai. It drains out of Lake Baikal and is the headwater tributary of the Yenisey. It was formerly known as the Lower or Nizhnyaya Angara (distinguishing it from the Upper Angara). Below its junction with the Ilim, it was formerly known as the Upper Tunguska (Verkhnyaya Tunguska, distinguishing it from the Lower Tunguska) and, with the names reversed, as the Lower Tunguska.

Course
Leaving Lake Baikal near the settlement of Listvyanka, the Angara flows north past the Irkutsk Oblast cities of Irkutsk, Angarsk, Bratsk, and Ust-Ilimsk.

Dams and reservoirs

Four dams of major hydroelectric plants - constructed since the 1950s - exploit the waters of the Angara:
 Irkutsk Dam, forming the Irkutsk Reservoir, which floods the valley of the river from its source to Irkutsk, and slightly raises the water level in Lake Baikal
 Bratsk Dam, forming the Bratsk Reservoir
 Ust-Ilimsk Dam, at Ust-Ilimsk, forming the Ust-Ilimsk Reservoir
 Boguchany Dam, at Kodinsk

The reservoirs of these dams flooded a number of villages along the Angara and its tributaries (including the historic fort of Ilimsk on the Ilim), as well as numerous agricultural areas in the river valley. Due to its effects on the way of life of the rural residents of the Angara valley, dam construction was criticized by a number of Soviet intellectuals, in particular by the Irkutsk writer Valentin Rasputin - both in his novel Farewell to Matyora (1976) and in his non-fiction book Siberia, Siberia (1991).

Navigation

The Angara is navigable by modern watercraft on several isolated sections:
 from Lake Baikal to Irkutsk
 from Irkutsk to Bratsk
 on the Ust-Ilimsk Reservoir
 from the Boguchany Dam (Kodinsk) to the river's fall into the Yenisey.

The section between the Ust-Ilimsk Dam and the Boguchany Dam has not been navigable due to rapids. However, with the completion of the Boguchany Dam, and filling of its reservoir, at least part of this section of the river will become navigable as well. Nonetheless, this will not enable through navigation from Lake Baikal to the Yenisey, as none of the existing three dams has been provided with a ship lock or a boat lift, nor will the Boguchany Dam have one.

Despite the absence of a continuous navigable waterway, the Angara and its tributary the Ilim were of considerable importance for Russian colonization of Siberia since ca. 1630, when they (and the necessary portages) formed important water routes connecting the Yenisey with Lake Baikal and the Lena. The river lost its transportation significance after the construction of an overland route between Krasnoyarsk and Irkutsk and, later, the Trans-Siberian Railway.

Tributaries
The largest tributaries of the Angara are, from source to mouth:

 Irkut (left)
 Kitoy (left)
 Belaya (left)
 Oka (left)
 Iya (left)
 Ilim (right)
 Kova (left)
 Koda (right)
 Chadobets (right)
 Mura (left)
 Irkeneyeva (right)
 Taseyeva (left)

See also
 List of rivers of Russia
 Lena-Angara Plateau
 Yenisey Range

References

Citations

Bibliography
 .

External links

Angara River, southeast-central Russia
Angara River
Angara River photo
Map of region showing mouth of Angara River
Map book of region showing mouth of Angara River
Photo of river and dam

Rivers of Irkutsk Oblast
Rivers of Krasnoyarsk Krai
Articles containing video clips